Elizabeth Nyaruai (born appr. 1927) was Kenya's first female police officer. Nyaruai lives alone in a mud hut on an 89 acre piece of land given to her in the late 1960s by President Jomo Kenyatta in the semi-arid parts of Nyeri South District.

Family life

Nyaruai was born in 1927 and was brought up on a white settler's farm where her father worked as a herds boy.

Scouting

Nyaruai was one of the first Kenyan women to join the Scouting movement. After a white settler noticed her generosity, she convinced Nyaruai to become a Scout. Nyaruai was 10 years old. Nyaruai met Lord Baden-Powell, the founder of Scouting and is expected to attend ceremonies at his graveside in 2007 commemorating 100 years of Scouting.

See also

Scouting in Kenya

References

1920s births
Possibly living people
Kenyan police officers
Scouting and Guiding in Kenya